The Royal Gold Medal for architecture is awarded annually by the Royal Institute of British Architects on behalf of the British monarch, in recognition of an individual's or group's substantial contribution to international architecture. It is given for a distinguished body of work rather than for one building, and is therefore not awarded for merely being currently fashionable.

The medal was first awarded in 1848 to Charles Robert Cockerell, and its second recipient was the Italian Luigi Canina in 1849. The winners include some of the most influential architects of the 19th and 20th centuries, including Eugène Viollet-le-Duc (1864), Frank Lloyd Wright (1941), Le Corbusier (1953), Walter Gropius (1956), Ludwig Mies van der Rohe (1959) and Buckminster Fuller (1968). Candidates of all nationalities are eligible to receive the award.

Not all recipients were architects. Also recognised were engineers such as Ove Arup (1966) and Peter Rice (1992), who undoubtedly played an outstanding role in the realisation of some of the 20th century's key buildings all over the world. Repeatedly, the prize was awarded to influential writers on architecture, including scholars such as the Rev Robert Willis (1862), Sir Nikolaus Pevsner (1967), and Sir John Summerson (1976), as well as theoreticians such as Lewis Mumford (1961) and Colin Rowe (1995). It honoured archaeologists such as Sir Austen Henry Layard (1868), Karl Richard Lepsius (1869), Melchior de Vogüé (1879), Heinrich Schliemann (1885), Rodolfo Lanciani (1900) and Sir Arthur Evans (1909), and painters such as Lord Leighton (1894), and Sir Lawrence Alma-Tadema (1906). Another notable exception was the 1999 award to the city of Barcelona.

List of recipients

References

External links
 RIBA page on Royal Gold Medal
 

Architecture awards
British awards
Awards established in 1848

1848 establishments in the United Kingdom
Royal Institute of British Architects